Axel Schock (born 11 September 1965 in Neckarbischofsheim, Baden-Württemberg) is a German journalist and author.

Schock grew up in Sinsheim. He studied literature and theater at the Free University of Berlin. In 1982 he published his first work and in 1985 received the Scheffelpreis, a prize in literature awarded to high school graduates.

He lives openly gay in Berlin and works as a journalist and editor for different magazines and newspapers, including the gay magazine Hinnerk in Hamburg and citymag Berlin. As a freelance author, he writes articles for daily newspapers like Berliner Zeitung, taz and Berliner Morgenpost. Schock also writes features for radio (for example RIAS Berlin, DeutschlandRadio and Radio 100) and for TV. He has also written under a pseudonym.

Selected works (in German)
 Schreib-Spuren. (Co-Editor) (1993)
 Zehn Minuten. Jetzt. Kürzestgeschichten. (1993)
 I'm crazy for das Holzfällerhemd. (1994)
 Der schwule Sprachführer. (with Ulf Meyer) (1996)
 Out!: 800 berühmte Lesben, Schwule und Bisexuelle. (with Karen-Susan Fessel), 5. Edition. (2004)
 Das Queer Quiz Buch. (with Ulrike Anhamm) (1996)
 Ein letzter Gruß. Trauer – Anatomie eines Gefühls. (1997)
 Die Bibliothek von Sodom. Das Buch der schwulen Bücher. (1998)
 Die Cazzo-Story. Pornostars, made in Germany. (2000)
 Die acapickels drücken sich aus. (2000)
 Der schöne Mann ist tot. Beiträge zum Literaturpreis der Schwulen Buchläden. (Editor, 2003)
 Out im Kino. Das lesbisch-schwule Filmlexikon. (with Manuela Kay) (2004)
 Out-Takes Das lesbisch-schwule Lexikon des unnützen Wissens. (with Karin Schupp) (2005)
 Mein schwules Auge 3. (with Rinaldo Hopf) (2006)
 Schwule Orte. 150 berühmt-berüchtigte Schauplätze (2007)
 Mein schwules Auge 4. (with Rinaldo Hopf) (2007)
 Mein schwules Auge 5. (with Rinaldo Hopf) (2008)
 Mein schwules Auge 6. (with Rinaldo Hopf) (2009)

Prizes
 Scheffelpreis, 1985
 Literaturpreis der Schwulen Buchläden

References

External links
 Querverlag:Axel Schock 
 Katalog der Deutschen Nationalbibliothek

1965 births
Living people
People from Rhein-Neckar-Kreis
German gay writers
Writers from Baden-Württemberg
21st-century German LGBT people